Cherry Island may refer to

Cherry Island (Antarctica)
Cherry Island (Loch Ness)
Cherry Island (Maryland), an island in Dorchester County, Maryland
Cherry Island (Michigan), in the Detroit River
Cherry Island (Potagannissing Bay), also in Michigan, between Drummond Island in Michigan and St. Joseph Island in Ontario, Canada.
 Cherry Island (Montana), an island in the Yellowstone River near Billings, Montana
Cherry Island, a small island in West Isles Parish, New Brunswick
 Cherry Island, New York, an island in the St. Lawrence Seaway, located near the international boundary line between Canada and the United States.
 Anuta, an island in Temotu Province, Solomon Islands.